David Eugene Heineman (born May 12, 1948) is an American politician who served as the 39th governor of Nebraska from 2005 to 2015. A member of the Republican Party, he was the 39th treasurer of Nebraska from 1995 to 2001 and 37th lieutenant governor of Nebraska from 2001 to 2005 under governor Mike Johanns. Heineman took over the governorship after Johanns resigned to become the U.S. Secretary of Agriculture. 

Heineman won full four-year terms in the 2006 and 2010 elections. Due to this, he is the longest-serving Nebraska Governor with just under 10 years of service. Heineman was barred by term limits from seeking a third full four-year term in 2014 as the Constitution of Nebraska prohibits governors from seeking a third term. He was succeeded by businessman Pete Ricketts.

Early life and education 
Heineman was born in Falls City, Nebraska, the son of Irene (née Larkin) and Jean T. Heineman, a stock manager for J. C. Penney. He lived in a variety of places in eastern Nebraska during his youth, eventually attending high school in Wahoo, Nebraska. He graduated from the United States Military Academy in 1970. He served five years in the U.S. Army, leaving with the rank of captain. He also graduated from the Army Ranger training program.

Career 
Heineman served on the Fremont City Council from 1990 to 1994. He also served two terms as Nebraska State Treasurer from 1995 to 2001. He was appointed the 37th Lieutenant Governor of Nebraska by Governor Mike Johanns on October 1, 2001 after David Maurstad resigned to take a post in the administration of George W. Bush. He was elected to his first full term as Nebraska Lieutenant Governor in 2002 as Johanns's running mate.

Governor of Nebraska

Heineman became governor on January 20, 2005, following Mike Johanns's resignation to become United States Secretary of Agriculture in President George W. Bush's Cabinet. On April 11, 2005, he announced that he would be seeking election to a full four-year term. He had the backing of Nebraska Senator Chuck Hagel, although he faced a difficult challenge in the Republican primary from former Nebraska Cornhuskers football coach and U.S. Representative Tom Osborne. He took 49 percent of the more than 197,000 votes cast and Osborne 45 percent.

In the November 7, 2006 general election, Heineman defeated Democratic nominee David Hahn, securing 73.4% of the vote to Hahn's 24.5%.  The Lincoln Journal Star's analysis of the 2006 gubernatorial race attributed Heineman's win to his opposition to Class I rural school reorganization and the granting of resident college tuition rates to the children of undocumented immigrants, helping him win over rural voters. This proved critical in the primary. While Osborne carried most of the Omaha and Lincoln areas, which cast more than two-thirds of Nebraska's vote, Heineman won by sufficient margins in western and central Nebraska to secure the nomination.

In 2010, Heineman signed two bills restricting abortion. One bill banned abortions at and after 20 weeks of pregnancy, based on the claim that fetuses of that age can feel pain; the other required that women seeking abortions be screened for mental-health problems.

Heineman was reelected in 2010 with 73.9 percent of the vote to Democratic nominee Mike Meister's 26.1%. In June 2011, Heineman became the first sitting governor to endorse Mitt Romney's presidential campaign.

As of 2012 Heineman worked with the Nebraska Legislature to pass the "largest tax relief package in Nebraska history". His website describes him as a "leader for Nebraska’s agricultural industry", stating that he secured trade deals for the export of wheat, soybeans and other commodities.

In January 2013, he approved a revised route for the Keystone Pipeline, that would avoid the environmentally sensitive Sandhills region, but cut through the High Plains Aquifer. Heineman was able to do this after a 2012 state law "let oil pipeline companies take their projects directly to the governor, bypassing the Nebraska Public Service Commission", which Nebraska justices upheld even though a lower court had blocked this law.

In March 2014, together with Nebraska Attorney General Jon Bruning, Heineman brought Nebraska into a lawsuit filed by Missouri Attorney General Chris Koster against California's egg production standards; in a press release, Heineman stated "This is about protecting Nebraska’s farmers and ranchers from the potential for regulatory burdens that hamper interstate trade."  In October 2014, federal judge Kimberly Mueller dismissed the lawsuit, rejecting the states' challenge to Proposition 2, California's prohibition on the sale of eggs laid by caged hens kept in conditions more restrictive than those approved by California voters in a 2008 ballot initiative. Heineman had previously squared off against the Humane Society of the U.S., a champion of Proposition 2.

In April 2014, Heineman signed a bill striking the word "firearms" from the list of those items a governor may suspend during a state of emergency. In January 2015, Heinemann relinquished the governorship of Nebraska due to term limits. He was succeeded by fellow Republican Pete Ricketts.

In 2019, Heineman announced his support for Janet Palmtag in her candidacy for the Nebraska legislature.

Personal life  
Heineman is married to Sally Ganem, a former elementary school principal. They have one son.

See also 

2010 Nebraska gubernatorial election

References

External links

|-

|-

|-

|-

|-

|-

1948 births
American United Methodists
Republican Party governors of Nebraska
Lieutenant Governors of Nebraska
Living people
Nebraska city council members
People from Dundy County, Nebraska
People from Fremont, Nebraska
People from Jefferson County, Nebraska
People from Red Willow County, Nebraska
People from Falls City, Nebraska
People from Saunders County, Nebraska
State treasurers of Nebraska
United States Army officers
United States Military Academy alumni